The 2000 British Grand Prix (formally the LIII Foster's British Grand Prix) was a Formula One motor race held on 23 April 2000 at Silverstone Circuit, England. It was the fourth race of the 2000 Formula One season and the 55th British Grand Prix. The 60-lap race was won by McLaren driver David Coulthard after starting from fourth position. His teammate Mika Häkkinen finished second with Michael Schumacher third for the Ferrari team.

Background
The Grand Prix was contested by eleven teams, each of two drivers. The teams, also known as constructors were, McLaren, Ferrari, Jordan, Jaguar, Williams, Benetton, Prost, Sauber, Arrows, Minardi and BAR. Tyre supplier Bridgestone brought four different tyre compounds to the race: two dry compounds, soft and medium, and two wet-weather compounds, soft and hard.

Going into the race Ferrari driver Michael Schumacher led the Drivers' Championship with 30 points, ahead of Rubens Barrichello on 9 points and Giancarlo Fisichella on 8. Mika Häkkinen in fourth and Ralf Schumacher in fifth were tied on 6 points. In the Constructors' Championship Ferrari were leading with 39 points, McLaren and Benetton were second and third with 10 and 8 points, respectively, whilst Jordan and Williams were tied in fourth place with 7 points each. Ferrari and Michael Schumacher had so far dominated the championship, winning the previous three races. Championship competitors Barrichello, Fisichella and Häkkinen had gained one second-place finish each, and Ralf Schumacher, Heinz-Harald Frentzen and David Coulthard had achieved one third-place podium finish each.

Following the San Marino Grand Prix on 9 April the teams conducted testing sessions at the Silverstone Circuit from 11–14 April to prepare for the upcoming Grand Prix at the track. The sessions were marked with intermittent rain making the track slippery. Barrichello set the quickest times on the first day, ahead of Jordan driver Jarno Trulli. Ralf Schumacher was quickest on the second day. BAR driver Jacques Villeneuve hit a fox at the back of the circuit, limiting his testing time. Michael Schumacher was fastest on the third day. Villeneuve's teammate Ricardo Zonta crashed into a spectator enclosure at the Stowe corner suffering a cut to his right middle finger. BAR later revealed Zonta's crash was caused by a front suspension failure and withdrew from testing. Michael Schumacher was fastest on the final day of testing. As a result of Zonta's crash, the tyre wall at Stowe corner was extended by one tyre in height and two tyres in depth. The gravel trap around the area was also made smoother.

In a controversial move the Fédération Internationale de l'Automobile (FIA)—Formula One's governing body—decided to stage the British Grand Prix in April instead of the event's traditional mid-July date, with the race taking place on Easter Sunday. No specific reason was given for the move, though the reinstatement of the Belgian Grand Prix—initially excluded from the calendar due to problems concerning the country's tobacco advertising laws—and the return of the United States Grand Prix were suggested as possible reasons. The owner of Formula One's commercial rights Bernie Ecclestone had scheduled the French Grand Prix to be held in the month of April with the British Grand Prix in July though "internal politics" in France prevented the change.

Much of the discussion heading into the event was a revision to allow teams to use modified pit lane speed limiters. It was in response to preventing driver aids like traction control and launch control from being secretly implemented. Most of the drivers agreed that the change would reduce the risk of drivers entering and exiting the pit lane. However, they expressed concern that they would not drive safely at a slow speed and the possibility that mechanics or other cars could be hit would be increased.

Practice
There were four practice sessions held before the Sunday race, two one-hour sessions on Friday and two 45-minute sessions on Saturday. The Friday morning and afternoon practice sessions were held on a dry track early in the first practice session but it rained throughout the rest of the day. Frentzen was fastest in the first session with a time of 1:27.683, almost half a second quicker than Jaguar driver Eddie Irvine. The McLaren drivers were third and fourth, Coulthard faster than Häkkinen. Jarno Trulli was fifth, ahead of Villeneuve. Barrichello, Alexander Wurz, Fisichella and Marc Gené rounded out the top ten fastest drivers in the session. An electrical failure on Ralf Schumacher's car prevented him from setting a lap time. In the second practice session, Frentzen remained fastest with his lap from the first session; the circuit was too wet for him and others to improve their lap times. The session was disrupted as Coulthard's McLaren pulled out to the side of the Hangar Straight with an hydraulic problem – this required a suspension as the recovery vehicle got stuck in mud meaning a tractor had to pull it out—and Villeneuve nearly struck a marshal assisting Coulthard.

The weather remained wet for the Saturday morning practice sessions. Coulthard was fastest in the third session, setting a time of 1:33.614; Häkkinen ended with the second-quickest lap. Michael Schumacher and Barrichello were third and fifth, respectively; they were separated by Ralf Schumacher. The Jordan drivers ended sixth and seventh with Frentzen quicker than Trulli. Mika Salo, Pedro Diniz and Jos Verstappen followed in the top ten. In the final practice session, Häkkinen ended up fastest with a time of 1:33.132, with Coulthard setting the third-quickest lap time. The pair were separated by Michael Schumacher with his teammate Barrichello fourth-fastest. Ralf Schumacher was fifth overall. Fisichella followed in sixth, having lost most of the session due to an oil leak, requiring an engine change. Frentzen, Verstappen, Trulli and Salo completed the top ten ahead of qualifying. Diniz spun off the circuit damaging his car's front suspension in a crash. Williams driver Jenson Button spun into the gravel trap at turn 14 and was subsequently hit by Irvine's Jaguar. The Williams sustained a broken front and rear suspension whilst the Jaguar's monocoque was punctured. Both drivers were unhurt.

Qualifying

Saturday's afternoon one hour qualifying session saw each driver limited to twelve laps, with the grid order decided by their fastest laps. During this session, the 107% rule was in effect, which necessitated each driver set a time within 107 per cent of the quickest lap to qualify for the race. The session was held in cloudy weather conditions but on a drying race track. Barrichello clinched his third pole position of his career, his first at the circuit, with a time of 1:25.703. He was joined on the front row of the grid by Frentzen recording a lap 0.003 seconds slower. It was also his best qualifying performance of the season. Häkkinen qualified third having been forced to ease off the throttle after making a mistake during his final quick lap. He was in front of teammate Coulthard who encountered traffic on his final qualifying runs. Michael Schumacher—who made a change to his car, only to see him make more mistakes—qualified fifth and missed starting his final lap by 0.1 seconds. Button and Ralf Schumacher clinched sixth and seventh positions, respectively, although both drivers had mixed feelings over their performances. Verstappen initially held the pole position in the session's closing seconds but spun off the track and was demoted to eighth. Irvine took ninth and Villeneuve rounded out the top ten fastest qualifiers. Trulli qualified in eleventh position but was prevented from setting a quicker time as he was held up by one of the Williams. He was ahead of Fisichella in the faster of the two Benettons. Diniz qualified in 13th position, eight tenths of a second ahead of teammate Salo in 18th; both drivers disadvantaged by the timing of their runs.

The two were separated by Johnny Herbert who encountered yellow flags during the session. He was followed up by Jean Alesi and Nick Heidfeld in the Prosts, who sandwiched Zonta. Behind Heidfeld, Pedro de la Rosa in the slower Arrows set the 19th-fastest time and made a mistake during his final qualifying run. Wurz ran his team's spare car due to an unidentifiable problem on his race car and was 20th-quickest. The two Minardi drivers Marc Gené and Gastón Mazzacane completed the final row of the grid.
The large amount of rain during the weeks leading up to the race caused extensive damage and flooding to Silverstone's car parks which saw a large reduction in spectator numbers in qualifying from 60,000 in 1999 to 15,000 in 2000. The car parks were closed to all traffic except for coaches which meant some spectators walked to the circuit to attend the Grand Prix. The circuit's owners placed 300 tonnes of hardcore material in car parks and entrance routes to the circuit for the Sunday race.

Qualifying classification

Warm-up
The conditions on the grid were dry before the race; conditions were expected to remain consistent throughout the race. The drivers were due to take to the track at 09:30 BST (UTC+1) for a 30-minute warm-up session, but the session was delayed by 100 minutes due to persistent fog which prevented the medical helicopter from arriving at the track. The Drivers' Parade was cancelled because of the delays. The McLaren drivers were running quicker than their pace in qualifying; Coulthard had the fastest time of 1:26.800. Häkkinen was fourth in the other McLaren, two tenths of a second behind Coulthard. de la Rosa and Ralf Schumacher split them for the second- and third-quickest times, respectively. Häkkinen's race car was afflicted with a sensor failure which saw him use his team's spare monocoque whilst the problem was fixed. Ralf Schumacher meanwhile downplayed his chances, predicting that a wet race would give him a better finishing position.

Race
The race started at 13:00 local time. Barrichello maintained his start line advantage going into the first corner, whilst Frentzen remained in second position. Villeneuve made the best start in the field moving from 10th to 6th by the end of the first lap, whilst Michael Schumacher lost three positions over the same distance. At the completion of the first lap the drivers in the top ten positions were Barrichello, Frentzen, Coulthard, Häkkinen, Button, Villeneuve, Ralf Schumacher, Michael Schumacher, Verstappen and Trulli. Barrichello began to maintain a one-second gap between himself and Frentzen. Ralf Schumacher passed Villeneuve at Stowe corner for sixth position on lap 2. Further back Alesi lost 13th position after being overtaken by Salo whilst Diniz lost three places as he was involved in an incident.

The leading drivers began to gradually build a gap from Trulli by lap 3. Two laps later Wurz made up a further position when he passed Zonta for 15th. Häkkinen ran wide on lap eight and came under pressure from Button. By the 14th lap, Barrichello had a lead of six-tenths of a seconds over Frentzen, who in turn was nine-tenths of a second in front of Coulthard. Häkkinen was a further nine-tenths of a second behind his teammate and continued to battle Button for fourth position, who was continuing to run 1.1 seconds ahead of Ralf Schumacher. Wurz, who was pressuring Alesi in 14th, became the first driver to make a pit stop to ensure he would get a clear track. Salo and Fisichella pitted over the next three laps. Verstappen pulled over to the side of the track with electrical problems on lap 20.

Frentzen and Ralf Schumacher became the next two laps to pit on lap 24 and remerged in seventh and eighth. Button made his pit stop one lap later and joined behind teammate Ralf Schumacher. de la Rosa drove to the side of the circuit with hydraulic problems and retired on lap 28. Coulthard drafted down the straight and passed Barrichello at Stowe corner to become the new race leader on lap 30. Coulthard immediately began to build a gap between himself and Barrichello. Häkkinen made his only pit stop of the race on lap 31 and changed a flat-spotted tyre. He rejoined in eighth position. Coulthard and Villeneuve both pitted on the 33rd lap. Barrichello spun off the track with an hydraulic issue and pitted on lap 35. He was pushed into his garage to retire with an gearbox problem one lap later.

Michael Schumacher set a new fastest lap of the race on lap 36, a 1:26.797 as he pulled out a gap before his pit stop. Zonta retired on the next lap when he spun off. Michael Schumacher made his pit stop on lap 37, allowing Frentzen to take over the lead. The Jordan driver pitted on lap 42 handing the lead back to Coulthard. The Williams pair both pitted over the next two laps, promoting Häkkinen and Michael Schumacher into second and third positions. Michael Schumacher was unable to catch Häkkinen as he was held up by backmarkers. Herbert became the final driver to make a scheduled pit stop on lap 48. At the completion of lap 49 with the scheduled pit stops completed the top ten drivers were Coulthard, Häkkinen, Michael Schumacher, Frentzen, Ralf Schumacher, Button, Villeneuve, Trulli, Fisichella and Salo.

Häkkinen started to reduce the gap to Coulthard on lap 51 who had problems with his gearbox. On the same lap, Frentzen occurred problems as he could not change his gears and fell behind Ralf Schumacher and Button. He drove to his garage three laps later to retire. On lap 56, Häkkinen set a new fastest lap of the race, a 1:26.217 as he continued close on Coulthard. Villeneuve became the event's final retirement with gearbox issues on the same lap. Häkkinen finished second 1.4-second behind, ahead of Michael Schumacher in third, Ralf Schumacher in fourth, Button in fifth and Trulli rounded out the points scoring positions in sixth. Fisichella, Salo, Wurz, Alesi and Diniz followed up in the next five positions. Herbert, Irvine, Gené and Mazzacane finished in the following four positions. Villeneuve and Frentzen were the last of the classified finishers despite not managing to cross the finish line because of their retirements.

Post-race

The top three drivers appeared on the podium to collect their trophies and in the subsequent press conference. Coulthard said that overtaking Barrichello gave him the advantage during the first pit stops. Coulthard additionally revealed that he used inspiration from 1992 Drivers' Champion Nigel Mansell's overtake on Nelson Piquet at the 1987 British Grand Prix to execute the similar passing manoeuvre. He also believed that his victory made him confident about posing a challenge for the Drivers' Championship saying "my best years are still ahead of me."

Race classification

Championship standings after the race 

Drivers' Championship standings

Constructors' Championship standings

Note: Only the top five positions are included for both sets of standings.

References

British Grand Prix
British Grand Prix
Grand Prix
British Grand Prix